Marco Briganti (born 6 May 1982) is an Italian footballer who plays for A.C. Bastia 1924 in Serie D.

Biography
Born in Città di Castello, Umbria, Briganti started his career at Serie C2 team Rondinella. He then spent 2 seasons in Serie D before signed by Imolese. After 3 seasons in Serie C2, for Imolese, Forlì and Sansovino, he was signed by Serie C1 team Pistoiese. In the next season he terminated the contract with Pistoiese and signed by Gubbio and winning the promotion play-off in 2010 and again in 2011, promoted form the Seconda Divisione to Serie B. He signed for Monza in January 2014. In January 2015 he was signed by Cremonese.

References

External links
 Football.it Profile 
 

Italian footballers
Imolese Calcio 1919 players
A.C. Sansovino players
U.S. Pistoiese 1921 players
A.S. Gubbio 1910 players
A.C. Monza players
Santarcangelo Calcio players
Vis Pesaro dal 1898 players
Serie B players
Serie C players
Serie D players
Association football central defenders
People from Città di Castello
1982 births
Living people
Sportspeople from the Province of Perugia
Footballers from Umbria